is a railway station on the Tōkyū Den-en-toshi Line located in Setagaya, Tokyo, Japan.  This station is one of the nearest station to Kinuta Park.

Station layout
There are 2 side platforms.

History
May 10, 1969: Closed along with the discontinuance of Tamagawa Line.
1993: North exit renovated and the bus terminal built.

External links
 Official information site

Railway stations in Japan opened in 1977
Tokyu Den-en-toshi Line
Stations of Tokyu Corporation
Railway stations in Tokyo